Sidney High School may refer to:

Sidney High School (Iowa) in Sidney, Iowa
Sidney High School (Nebraska) in Sidney, Nebraska
Sidney High School (Montana) in Sidney, Montana
Sidney High School (New York) in Sidney, New York
Sidney High School (Texas) in Sidney, Texas
Sidney High School (Ohio) in Sidney, Ohio